A national grassland is an area of protected and managed federal lands in the United States authorized by Title III of the Bankhead–Jones Farm Tenant Act of 1937. For administrative purposes, they are essentially identical to national forests, except that grasslands are areas primarily consisting of prairie. Like national forests, national grasslands may be open for hunting, grazing, mineral extraction, recreation and other uses. Various national grasslands are typically administered in conjunction with nearby national forests.

All but four national grasslands are on or at the edge of the Great Plains. Those four are in southeastern Idaho, northeastern California, central Oregon, and a reserve in Illinois. The three national grasslands in North Dakota, together with one in northwestern South Dakota, are administered jointly as the Dakota Prairie Grasslands.

Soil Conservation Service

The catastrophic Dust Bowl of the 1930s led to the creation of the Soil Conservation Service in 1933.  This and subsequent federal laws paved the way for establishing national grasslands.

List

Related
The smaller, Midewin National Tallgrass Prairie was created much later and east of the Mississippi River under a different Act, so is technically not a "National Grassland" but it is instead managed by the Forest Service like one, as a unique prairie resource.

See also

 Temperate grasslands, savannas, and shrublands
 List of protected grasslands of North America
 List of U.S. National Forests
 Wilderness preservation systems in the United States

References

External links

 01

Prairies
Grasslands
Grassland
1930s establishments in the United States